The name Pasi (Hindi: पासी) is composed of two words Pa (grip) and asi (sword), implying thereby one who hold a sword in his hand or in other words a soldier. Another etymology is that the name comes from the Sanskrit pashika, "one who uses a noose." The Pasi are said to have used nooses for climbing trees. 

In Italian, it stems from the word pace, meaning peace. It is also a Finnish forename, a form of Basil.

Pasi is a surname used by the Pasi community and people from Punjab. Notable individuals with this surname are listed below.

Geeta Pasi, an American diplomat.
Maharaja Bijli Pasi, a king from the Pasi community. He ruled during the Muslim period from a site located near Lucknow.
Balraj Pasi, an Indian politician.  He was elected to the Lok Sabha, the lower house of the Parliament of India from the Nainital constituency of Uttar Pradesh.
Subhash Pasi, a member of Legislative Assembly, Uttar Pradesh
Suresh Pasi, Indian Politician and a member of 17th Legislative Assembly of Uttar Pradesh of India.
Madari Pasi, a leader of the militant peasant movement Eka Movement.
Uda Devi Pasi, claimed to have been a fighter at Sikandar Bagh in the Indian Rebellion of 1857.
Masuriya Din Pasi (born 2 October 1911) was an Indian politician, a fight against Criminal Tribes Act for independence who served as a member of the Uttar Pradesh
Riccardo Pasi, Italian footballer.
Giacomo Pasi, Italian bishop.

See also
Passi (surname)

References